Chimta literally means tongs. Over time it has evolved into a traditional instrument of South Asia by the permanent addition of small brass jingles.  This instrument is often used in popular Punjabi folk songs, Bhangra music and the Sikh religious music known as Gurbani Kirtan.

The player of the chimta is able to produce a chiming sound if he holds the joint of the instrument in one hand and strikes the two sides of the chimta together. The jingles are made of metal and thus it produces a metallic sound and helps to keep up the beat of the song.

In Bhangra music or at weddings it is often combined with Dhol and Bhangra dancers.

Construction and design 
The chimta consists of a long, flat piece of  steel or iron that is pointed at both ends, and folded over in the middle. A metal ring is attached near the fold, and there are jingles or rings attached along the sides at regular intervals. Sometimes there are seven pairs of jingles. The rings are plucked in a downward motion to produce tinkling sounds. Chimtas with large rings are used at rural festivals while ones with smaller rings are often used as an accompaniment to Bhangra dancers and singers of traditional Indian hymns.

Notable players 
The late Alam Lohar is famous for playing this instrument and introducing it to global audiences. Today, musicians like Kamal Heer and Arif Lohar play this instrument. Also known as the "rusty tambourine sword", the chimta has been played by members of the experimental rock band His Name Is Alive on recent tours.

References 

Punjabi culture
Indian musical instruments
Bhangra (music)
Punjabi words and phrases
Asian percussion instruments
Folk instruments of Punjab
Pakistani musical instruments